House of Spies is a 2017 spy novel by Daniel Silva. It is the seventeenth Gabriel Allon series. It was released on July 11, 2017 and debuted on the New York Times Bestseller list at #1.

References

External links
Daniel Silva - Official Website (Book: House of Spies)
goodreads.com

American spy novels
Novels by Daniel Silva
2017 American novels
HarperCollins books